The 2018 Saudari Cup was contested between the women's national teams of Malaysia and Singapore from 9 to 12 August 2018. The Saudari cup is an annual event between the two sides, which started in 2014, and had been won by Malaysia in each of the first three editions. All three previous tournaments were won 2–1 by Malaysia, including the most recent which was played in Johor in 2016. The tournament was contested over six Women's Twenty20 International (WT20I) matches, with the first five matches played at the Selangor Turf Club in Kuala Lumpur and the final match played at the UKM-YSD Cricket Oval in Bangi.

Following the International Cricket Council's decision to grant T20I status to all matches played between women's sides of Associate Members after 1 July 2018, this edition had this enhanced status. Singapore women played their first matches with WT20I status during this series.

Malaysia won the series 4–2, although it is also reported as two separate series (one for 2017 and one for 2018) both of which Malaysia won 2–1.

T20I series

1st WT20I

2nd WT20I

3rd WT20I

4th WT20I

5th WT20I

6th WT20I

References

External links
 Series home at ESPN Cricinfo

International cricket competitions in 2018
International cricket competitions in Malaysia